Encope emarginata is a species of echinoderm belonging to the family Mellitidae.

The species is found in America.

Although Encope emarginata can be found in America, fossil traces have been found in the southernmost part of Brazil's coast. The area that is inhibited by Encope emarginata is below the action of the normal wave regime, thus the fossils of this species is only truly disturbed during extreme coastal weather (Lopes, 2011).

References
2. Lopes, P.R., (2011). Fossil Sand Dollars (Echinoidea: Clypeasteroida) from the Southern Brazilian Coast. The Sociedade Brazileira de Paleontologia, 14

Mellitidae